This New Day was a Northern Irish radio programme broadcast on BBC Radio Ulster.

The programme, an easy listening mix of music and talk presented by Kim Lenaghan, aired on a Sunday morning until 2014.

Since 2014, it has been replaced by her own weekend programme, presented by Kim Lenaghan every Saturday between 7:00am to 8:00am and every Sunday between 7:00am to 8:30am.

External links
 
 Kim Lenaghan

BBC Radio Ulster programmes